In modern usage, metric is used almost exclusively in commercial transactions. These units are mostly historical, although they are still used in some limited contexts and in Maltese idioms and set phrases. Many of these terms are directly related to Arabic units and some to Sicilian units.  The Weights and Measures Ordinance of 1921 established uniformity in the conversion of such weights and measures. All these measures were defined as simple multiples of the Imperial units then in use in Britain.

Length 

Length units were typically used for measuring goods and building sizes. Distances were traditionally measured in terms of travel time, which explains the lack of large-scale units.

Area

Land 

In 1921, these units were redefined with respect to the British Imperial standard. These values reflect this change.

Square

Volume 

These units were all (except for the cubic units) defined in 1921 relative to the British Imperial gallon, which was defined in the 1824 act. This is equal to 10 pounds of water at a specified temperature and air pressure. This (~ litres) is slightly larger than the modern definition (exactly  litres).

Beer, wine, and spirits measure 

None of the units from this group are mentioned in TY Maltese.

Milk and Oil measure

Dry 

None of these units are mentioned in TY Maltese. Note that there are two conflicting values for the siegħ ( and  tomna, respectively).

Cubic

Mass 

All the Maltese mass units were redefined relative to the British Imperial ton in 1921. Before this, the units were presumably based on an Arabic standard. All equivalent measures listed in pounds below are exact values.

Note: there are two distinct units which are named kwart.

Money

This system was used during the rule of the Knights of St. John in Malta. Subsequent currencies in use were sterling and the Maltese pound. Malta has since adopted the euro.

References 

 Maltese-English Dictionary, appendix 10, p1658, by Aquilina, published by Midsea Books Ltd. No ISBN available.
 Teach Yourself Maltese, pp125–6
 Att dwar il-Metroloġija Kap. 454

Maltese
Science and technology in Malta
Systems of units
Units of measurement by country